O'Kane is an Irish surname, anglicised from the Irish Ó Catháin, and was the name of a significant clann in Ulster, a province of Ireland. The surname has also been anglicised as O'Cahan, Kane, O'Keane, O'Kean, O'Keen, O'Keene, Keen, Keene, Kain, O'Kaine, and similar variations thereof. They are descended from Eógan, son of Niall of the Nine Hostages. In the late Middle Ages, they were the primary sept under the Ó Néill clann of Ulster, holding the privilege of inaugurating the Chief of the Ó Néill.

People
Aidan O'Kane
Damien O'Kane
Dene O'Kane
Deirdre O'Kane
Eunan O'Kane
Gary O'Kane
Gerard O'Kane
Jake O'Kane
John O'Kane
Liam O'Kane
Maggie O'Kane
Marty O'Kane
Mick O'Kane
Paddy O'Kane
Richard O'Kane
Sean O'Kane

See also
O'Cahan
USS O'Kane (DDG-77)
O'Kane Market and O'Kane Building, Monroe County, New York